Korvpalliklubi HITO is an Estonian basketball team, based in Jõhvi. The team is currently a member of the Korvpalli Meistriliiga. HITO play their home games at the Jõhvi Sports Hall.

Players

Current roster

Depth chart

History

References

External links
 
 basket.ee

Basketball teams in Estonia
Jõhvi